"Suga's Interlude" (Suga being stylized in all upper case) is a song by American singer Halsey and South Korean rapper Suga of boy band BTS. It was released on December 6, 2019 through Capitol Records as the third promotional single from Halsey's third studio album, Manic (2020). The song was released simultaneously with the album's second promotional single "Finally // Beautiful Stranger".

Background and composition 
In an Instagram live, Halsey explained why she included Suga on the track, stating "Yoongi is really introspective and has this really intelligent perspective on where we are and what we are doing in our unique lifestyles". "Suga's Interlude" is a "downtrodden" K-pop ballad based around a "somber piano melody", exploring themes of fulfilment, self-loathing and egotism while "encouraging fans to keep pursuing their dreams and look to the future".

Critical reception 
Lexi Lane from Atwood Magazine mentioned that the "combination of rap and Halsey's slower singing parts mesh well together sonically and provide a bridge between languages and cultures". Sara Delgado, writing for Teen Vogue, described the track as a "soft tempo track" that "mixes piano keys with airy synths", along with "Halsey's soulful vocals with Suga's sharp rap skills". In an article for Consequence of Sound, Nara Corcoran called the track a "downtrodden ballad" with Halsey "singing sorrowfully over a somber piano melody", and Suga "rapping in Korean quickly but gently" for various verses. Jason Lipshutz of Billboard described the production as "mournful, piano-led" that sees "Halsey [unfurl] a full chorus that focuses on inner struggle" while "Suga flies in with quick-hitting rhymes". Lipshutz also mentioned the "creative chemistry on display" that suggested a "fruitful partnership", as a possible reason why Suga appeared on the track.

Charts

Release history

References

2010s ballads
2019 singles
2019 songs
Halsey (singer) songs
Pop ballads
Songs written by Halsey (singer)
Songs written by Lido (musician)
Songs written by Suga (rapper)
Song recordings produced by Suga (rapper)